The Matsuyama Challenger is a professional tennis tournament played on hard courts. It is part of the Association of Tennis Professionals (ATP) Challenger Tour. It is held in Matsuyama, Japan.

Past finals

Singles

Doubles

References

ATP Challenger Tour
Hard court tennis tournaments
Tennis tournaments in Japan